Elroy Chester (June 14, 1969 – June 12, 2013) was an American serial killer who committed five murders in Texas. He was convicted and sentenced to death for one of the murders, and was executed in 2013.

Crimes 
Between 1997 and 1998, a series of burglaries and fatal shootings occurred in Port Arthur, Texas. In every case but one, the victims died in their homes during the night. The five people which Chester admitted to killing were:

 John Henry Sepeda (78) on Sept. 20. 1997
 Etta Mae Stallings (87) on Nov. 15. 1997
 Cheryl DeLeon (40) on Nov. 20. 1997, she was fatally beaten as she arrived home from work
 Albert Bolden Jr. (35) on Dec. 21. 1997, who was his common-law brother-in-law
 Willie Ryman III (38), on Feb. 6. 1998, a firefighter who tried to defend his nieces from Chester, after he sexually molested them

Later his DNA was linked to three rapes, including that of a ten-year-old girl. He also confessed to four non-fatal shootings. After his arrest, he said that he had committed these offenses because he was out of his mind "with hate for white people" due to lingering resentment over an altercation that he had once gotten into with a white employee of the Texas Department of Criminal Justice.

Trial 
During his trial, Chester made multiple outbursts, threatened the lives of police officers, prison guards, and the families of jurors, and at one point declared, "If I hadn't shot my brother-in-law, I'd still be out there shooting white folks."

He was convicted of the murder of Willie Ryman III and the assault of the two nieces. It took the jury only 11 and a half minutes to agree on a death sentence for Chester after he told them he would kill a guard if he was not sentenced to death.

The Texas court system ruled that Chester was legally competent to be executed, despite scoring below 70 on IQ tests and being previously placed in the Texas Department of Criminal Justice's Mentally Retarded Offenders Program. In the prosecution's closing arguments, it was argued that his disability was not a sufficient reason to stay his execution.

Since Chester was capable of hiding facts and lying to protect his own interests, using masks and gloves, and cutting exterior telephone lines before entering homes to burglarize, he showed persuasively that he was capable of forethought, planning, and complex execution of purpose. Therefore, the court found the evidence insufficient to support the claim that Chester was mentally retarded. 

In October 2012, the Supreme Court refused to hear an appeal from Chester.

Execution 
Chester was originally scheduled for execution on April 24, 2013,  but, due to an error in the execution warrant, the date was pushed back.

He was executed on June 12, 2013, at the Huntsville Unit, Huntsville, Texas, two days before his 44th birthday.

He is buried at Captain Joe Byrd Cemetery.

In media 
In 2013 a full-length documentary titled Killing Time was made about him and his execution.

In 2018 the case was covered by Investigation Discovery show Murder by Numbers, episode named Clown Mask Murders.

See also
 List of people executed in Texas, 2010–2019
 List of people executed in the United States in 2013
 List of serial killers in the United States

References

External links
 Death Row Information: Elroy Chester, Texas Department of Criminal Justice

1969 births
1998 murders in the United States
2013 deaths
20th-century American criminals
21st-century executions by Texas
21st-century executions of American people
American rapists
Executed American serial killers
Male serial killers
People convicted of murder by Texas
People executed by Texas by lethal injection
Racially motivated violence against European Americans